"You Should Be Mine (Don't Waste Your Time)" is the first single by Brian McKnight from his third studio album Anytime (1997). The song features guest vocals from Mase and contains an uncredited hook sung by Kelly Price. It reached #4 on the Billboard Hot R&B chart, and #17 on the Billboard Hot 100. It sold over 600,000 copies.

Charts

Weekly charts

Year-end charts

References

Brian McKnight songs
1997 singles
1997 songs
Songs written by Sean Combs
Mercury Records singles
Songs written by Brian McKnight
Songs written by Mase
Songs written by James Brown
Songs written by Stevie J
Songs written by Kelly Price
Hip hop soul songs